Marfa Public Radio is a network of public radio stations serving the Big Bend region of Far West Texas. Headquartered in Marfa, Texas, it is a member of National Public Radio.

Marfa Public Radio broadcasts on four frequencies in the Big Bend–flagship KRTS 93.5 FM in Marfa and full-time satellites KRTP 91.7 FM in Alpine, KDKY 91.5 FM in Marathon, and KOJP 95.3 FM in Presidio. Marfa Public Radio also operates KXWT, the NPR member for Odessa, Midland and the Permian Basin. The station features news and talk programming from NPR, plus local affairs and original music programs from the Big Bend.

History

In 2010/2011, approximately half of the station's budget came from the CPB. The station came into its own in 2011, when the Rock House fire broke out during its spring pledge drive. For the next three weeks, the station was a vital source of information about weather conditions, road conditions and evacuations. That coverage played a role in the pledge drive being the most successful in the station's history up to that point. It has since received significant support from across Texas, enabling it to hire a full-time news staff for the first time.

Gallery

See also
List of community radio stations in the United States

References

External links

NPR member stations
RTS
Community radio stations in the United States
Marfa, Texas